Ralph Ward Jackson (7 June 1806, Normanby – 6 August 1880, London) was a British railway promoter, entrepreneur and politician. He founded West Hartlepool, England in the 19th century.

Life
Son of William and Susanna Louisa Ward-Jackson, a Conservative, he was elected at the 1868 general election as the first the Member of Parliament for The Hartlepools, but was defeated at the 1874 general election.

Ward Jackson Park, which is located on the westerly end of Elwick Road in Hartlepool is named in his memory.

Family
Jackson married in 1829 Susanna Swainson, daughter of the industrialist Charles Swainson. They had one son.

References

External links 
 
 Ralph Ward Jackson

1806 births
1880 deaths
Conservative Party (UK) MPs for English constituencies
UK MPs 1868–1874
People from Hartlepool